Philip Mat Schuster (January 24, 1883 – October 31, 1926) was an American gymnast and track and field athlete who competed in the 1904 Summer Olympics. In 1904 he won the bronze medal in the team event. He was also 51st in gymnastics' all-around event, 54th in gymnastics' triathlon competition, and 55th in athletics' triathlon event.

References

External links
 Philip Schuster's profile at databaseOlympics

1883 births
1926 deaths
Athletes (track and field) at the 1904 Summer Olympics
Gymnasts at the 1904 Summer Olympics
Olympic bronze medalists for the United States in gymnastics
American male artistic gymnasts
Medalists at the 1904 Summer Olympics